The Sioux Valley School District is a public school district in Brookings County, based in Volga, South Dakota.

Schools
The Sioux Valley School District has one elementary school, one middle school, and one high school.

Elementary school
Sioux Valley Elementary School

Middle school
Sioux Valley Middle School

High school
Sioux Valley High School

References

External links

School districts in South Dakota